Centroctenus is a genus of South American wandering spiders first described by Cândido Firmino de Mello-Leitão in 1929.

Species
 it contains eleven species:
Centroctenus acara Brescovit, 1996 – Brazil
Centroctenus alinahui Brescovit, Torres, Rego & Polotow, 2020 – Ecuador
Centroctenus auberti (Caporiacco, 1954) – Venezuela, Brazil, French Guiana
Centroctenus chalkidisi Brescovit, Torres, Rego & Polotow, 2020 – Brazil
Centroctenus claudia Brescovit, Torres, Rego & Polotow, 2020 – Brazil
Centroctenus coloso Brescovit, Torres, Rego & Polotow, 2020 – Colombia
Centroctenus dourados Brescovit, Torres, Rego & Polotow, 2020 – Brazil
Centroctenus irupana Brescovit, 1996 – Bolivia
Centroctenus miriuma Brescovit, 1996 – Brazil
Centroctenus ocelliventer (Strand, 1909) (type) – Colombia, Brazil
Centroctenus varzea Brescovit, Torres, Rego & Polotow, 2020 – Brazil

References

Araneomorphae genera
Ctenidae
Spiders of South America
Taxa named by Cândido Firmino de Mello-Leitão